Presidential elections were held for the first time in Ghana on 27 April 1960. The elections were held alongside a referendum on creating an executive presidency. The winner of the election would become the country's first President if the new republican constitution was passed (which it did).

Candidates
There were only two candidates in the election:
Kwame Nkrumah, incumbent Prime Minister and leader of the Convention People's Party
J. B. Danquah, United Party leader and one of the Big Six

Results

Aftermath
After winning the election, and the passing of the new constitution in the simultaneous referendum, Nkrumah was inaugurated on 1 July 1960, replacing Governor-General William Hare as head of state. Danquah was imprisoned the following year under the Preventive Detention Act, but only held for a year. On his release, he was elected President of the Ghana Bar Association. He was imprisoned again in 1964 and died in jail.

Four years later, another referendum strengthened Nkrumah's powers and turned the country into a one-party state (with an official result of 99.91% in support).

Presidential elections in Ghana
Ghana
1960 in Ghana
Election and referendum articles with incomplete results